Marianne Elser Crowder (April 23, 1906 – June 4, 2010) was, until her death, the oldest living Girl Scout in the United States.

She joined the Wagon Wheel Council Troop 4 in 1918 and got her Golden Eaglet, then the GSUSA highest award. She later operated her own dance studio in Colorado Springs, Colorado and headed the dance department at Colorado College before moving to Menlo Park, California in 1939 where she continued to teach dance until she was in her mid-90s. In 2007, the Wagon Wheel Council named Crowder the nation's oldest Girl Scout after it conducted a nationwide search and sifted through council archives.

She enrolled in the Perry Mansfield School of Dance and Theater in Colorado and studied with many of the leading pioneers of modern dance, including Louis Horst, Doris Humphrey, Helen Tamiris, Hanya Holm and Daniel Nagrin. She resigned her position to marry writer Paul Crowder and they moved to California in 1940. For 19 years she taught in  Stanford University's Drama Department and choreographed dances for major Stanford productions for the Drama and Music Departments.

Death
She died on June 4, 2010 at her Palo Alto, California home at the age of 104 from pancreatic cancer. She was survived by two daughters, ten grandchildren and twelve great-grandchildren.

References

1906 births
2010 deaths
American centenarians
Deaths from cancer in California
Colorado College alumni
Deaths from pancreatic cancer
Girl Scouts of the USA people
People from Palo Alto, California
People from Colorado Springs, Colorado
Place of birth missing
Scouting pioneers
Stanford University Department of Drama faculty
People from Menlo Park, California
Women centenarians